This is a list of town tramway systems in Norway. It includes all tram systems in Norway, past and present; cities with currently operating systems are indicated in bold. Those tram systems that operated on other than standard gauge track (where known) are indicated in the 'Notes' column.

See also
 List of town tramway systems – parent article
 List of town tramway systems in Europe
 List of tram and light rail transit systems
 List of metro systems

References

Bibliography
 Books, Periodicals and External Links

Tramways
Norway